Elephant birds are members of the extinct ratite family Aepyornithidae, made up of flightless birds that once lived on the island of Madagascar. They are thought to have become extinct around 1000-1200 CE, probably as a result of human activity. Elephant birds comprised the genera Mullerornis, Vorombe and Aepyornis. While they were in close geographical proximity to the ostrich, their closest living relatives are kiwi (found only in New Zealand), suggesting that ratites did not diversify by vicariance during the breakup of Gondwana but instead evolved from ancestors that dispersed more recently by flying.

Other members of the family were also very large, exhibiting the phenomenon of island gigantism.

Description 

Elephant birds have been extinct since at least the 17th century. Étienne de Flacourt, a French governor of Madagascar during the 1640s and 1650s, mentioned an ostrich-like bird, said to inhabit unpopulated regions, although it is unclear whether he was repeating folk tales from generations earlier. In 1659, Flacourt wrote of the "vouropatra – a large bird which haunts the Ampatres and lays eggs like the ostriches; so that the people of these places may not take it, it seeks the most lonely places." Marco Polo also mentioned hearing stories of very large birds during his journey to the East during the late 13th century. These accounts are today believed to describe elephant birds.

Between 1830 and 1840 European travelers in Madagascar saw giant eggs and egg shells. English observers were more willing to believe the accounts of giant birds and eggs because they knew of the moa in New Zealand. In 1851 the French Academy of Sciences received three eggs and some bone fragments. The egg volume is about 160 times greater than that of a chicken egg.

Only the much older species Dromornis stirtoni from Australia rivals it in size among known fossil birds. In the same report, the upper weight limits for A. maximus and D. stirtoni were revised to 540 and 730 kg, respectively.

Species 
Up to 10 or 11 species in the genus Aepyornis have been described, but the validity of many have been disputed, with numerous authors treating them all in just one species, A. maximus. Up to three species have been described in Mullerornis. But recent work by Hansford & Turvey 2018 has restricted the number of aepyornithid species to four, with two in Aepyornis, one in Mullerornis, and one in Vorombe.
 Order Aepyornithiformes Newton 1884 [Aepyornithes Newton 1884]
 Family Aepyornithidae (Bonaparte 1853) [Aepyornithinae Bonaparte 1853]
 Genus Aepyornis Geoffroy Saint-Hilaire 1850
 Aepyornis hildebrandti Burckhardt 1893 (Hildebrandt's elephant bird)
 Aepyornis maximus Geoffroy Saint-Hilaire 1851 (giant elephant bird)
 Genus Mullerornis Milne-Edwards & Grandidier 1894
 Mullerornis modestus (Milne-Edwards & Grandidier 1869) Hansford & Turvey 2018 (Betsileo/robust elephant bird)
 Genus Vorombe Hansford & Turvey 2018
 Vorombe titan (Andrews 1894) Hansford & Turvey 2018

Several ratites outside of Madagascar have been posited as "aepyornithid"-like and could potentially make this clade considerably more speciose. These include Eremopezus from the Eocene of North Africa, unnamed Canary Island remains and several Neogene taxa in Eurasia.

Etymology 

Aepyornis maximus is commonly known as the 'elephant bird', a term that apparently originated from Marco Polo's account of the rukh in 1298, although he was apparently referring to an eagle-like bird strong enough to "seize an elephant with its talons". Sightings of eggs of elephant birds by sailors (e.g., text on the Fra Mauro map of 1467–69, if not attributable to ostriches) could also have been erroneously attributed to a giant raptor from Madagascar. The legend of the roc could also have originated from sightings of such a giant subfossil eagle related to the African crowned eagle, which has been described in the genus Stephanoaetus from Madagascar, being large enough to carry off large primates; today, lemurs still retain a fear of aerial predators such as these. Another might be the perception of ratites retaining neotenic features and thus being mistaken for enormous chicks of a presumably more massive bird.

The ancient Malagasy name for the bird is vorompatra, meaning "bird of the Ampatres". The Ampatres are today known as the Androy region of southern Madagascar.

Taxonomy and biogeography 

Like the ostrich, rhea, cassowary, emu, kiwi and extinct moa, Mullerornis and Aepyornis were ratites; they could not fly, and their breast bones had no keel. Because Madagascar and Africa separated before the ratite lineage arose, Aepyornis has been thought to have dispersed and become flightless and gigantic in situ.

More recently, it has been deduced from DNA sequence comparisons that the closest living relatives of elephant birds are New Zealand kiwi, though they are not particularly closely related, being estimated to have diverged from each other 54 million years ago. Elephant birds are actually part of the mid-Cenozoic Australian ratite radiation; their ancestors flew across the Indian Ocean well after Gondwana broke apart. The existence of possible flying palaeognaths in the Miocene such as Proapteryx further supports the view that ratites did not diversify in response to vicariance. Gondwana broke apart in the Cretaceous and their phylogenetic tree does not match the process of continental drift. Madagascar has a notoriously poor Cenozoic terrestrial fossil record, with essentially no fossils between the end of the Cretaceous (Maevarano Formation) and the Late Pleistocene. Molecular clock estimates from complete mitochondrial genomes obtained from Aepyornis eggshells suggest that Aepyornis and Mullerornis diverged from each other during the mid Oligocene around 27 million years ago, suggesting elephant birds must have been present on Madagascar before this time.

Claims of findings of "aepyornithid" egg remains on the eastern Canary Islands, if valid, would represent a major biogeographical enigma. These islands are not thought to have been connected to mainland Africa when elephant birds were alive. There is no indication that elephant birds evolved outside Madagascar, and today, the Canary Island eggshells are considered to belong to extinct North African birds that may not have been ratites (possibly Eremopezus/Psammornis, or even Pelagornithidae, prehistoric seabirds of immense size). Various "aepyornithid-like" eggs and bones occur in Paleogene and Miocene deposits in Africa and Europe.

Two whole eggs have been found in dune deposits in southern Western Australia, one in the 1930s (the Scott River egg) and one in 1992 (the Cervantes egg); both have been identified as Aepyornis maximus rather than Genyornis. It is hypothesized that the eggs floated from Madagascar to Australia on the Antarctic Circumpolar Current. Evidence supporting this is the finding of two fresh penguin eggs that washed ashore on Western Australia but originated in the Kerguelen Islands, and an ostrich egg found floating in the Timor Sea in the early 1990s.

Biology 
Examination of brain endocasts has shown that both A. maximus and A. hildebrandti had greatly reduced optic lobes, similar to those of their closest living relatives, the kiwis, and consistent with a similar nocturnal lifestyle. The optic lobes of Mullerornis were also reduced, but to a lesser degree, suggestive of a nocturnal or crepuscular lifestyle. A. maximus had relatively larger olfactory bulbs than A. hildebrandti, suggesting that the former occupied forested habitats where the sense of smell is more useful while the latter occupied open habitats.

Diet 
Because there is no rainforest fossil record in Madagascar, it is not known for certain if there were species adapted to dense forest dwelling, like the cassowary in Australia and New Guinea today. However, some rainforest fruits with thick, highly sculptured endocarps, such as that of the currently undispersed and highly threatened forest coconut palm (Voanioala gerardii), may have been adapted for passage through ratite guts, and the fruit of some palm species are indeed dark bluish-purple (e.g., Ravenea louvelii and Satranala decussilvae), just like many cassowary-dispersed fruits. A 2022 isotope analysis study suggested that Aepyornis hildebrandti likely had a grazing dominated diet, similar to that of the living greater rhea, while the other species (A. maximus, Mullerornis modestus and Vorombe titan) were probably browsers.

Reproduction 

Occasionally, subfossil eggs are found intact. The National Geographic Society in Washington, D.C. holds a specimen of an Aepyornis egg which was given to Luis Marden in 1967. The specimen is intact and contains the skeleton of the unhatched bird. The Denver Museum of Nature and Science in Colorado holds two intact eggs, one of which is currently on display. Another giant Aepyornis egg is on display at the Harvard Museum of Natural History in Cambridge, Massachusetts, and a complete, unbroken egg is held at the Leeds Discovery Centre in the UK. A cast of the egg is preserved at the Grant Museum of Zoology at London University.

An intact specimen also exists in the Kuleli Military High School Museum, Istanbul, Turkey.

David Attenborough owned an almost complete eggshell, dating from AD 600 to 700, which he pieced together from fragments that were given to him while making his 1961 BBC series Zoo Quest to Madagascar. In March 2011, the BBC broadcast the 60-minute documentary Attenborough and the Giant Egg, presented by Attenborough, about his personal scientific quest to discover the secrets of the elephant bird and its egg.

A complete eggshell is also available in the collection of the University of Wrocław Museum of Natural History.

There is also an intact specimen of an elephant bird's egg (contrasted with the eggs from other bird species, including a hummingbird's) on display at the Delaware Museum of Natural History, just outside Wilmington, Delaware, US, and another in the Natural History Museum, London.

The Melbourne Museum has two Aepyornis eggs. The first was acquired for £100 by Professor Frederick McCoy in June 1862, and is an intact example. In 1950 it was subjected to radiological examination, which revealed no traces of embryonic material. A second, side-blown Aepyornis egg was acquired at a later date.

The Western Foundation of Vertebrate Zoology, with one of the world's largest collections of avian eggs, has seven Aepyornis egg specimens.

A specimen is also held by the Science Department at Stowe School in Buckinghamshire, UK.

In the collections of the department of geology at the Field Museum of Natural History in Chicago there is a complete, side-blown egg collected, in about 1917, by Rev. Peter A. Bjelde.

A specimen of an egg is also held at Regional Museum of Natural History, Bhubaneswar which was donated by former Indian Ambassador Abasar Beuria and his wife Tripti Beuria from their collection.

In April 2013, a specimen was sold at Christie's in London for £66,675. The pre-sale estimate had been "more than $45,000".

In April 2018, staff at the Buffalo Museum of Science radiographed what had long been thought to be a model of an elephant bird egg.

Two eggs have been discovered on the Western Australia coast, one discovered in the 1930s and another in 1992. A study concluded that the egg found at Cervantes was 2,000 years old and had likely drifted across the Indian Ocean.

Relationship with humans

Extinction 

It is widely believed that the extinction of Aepyornis was a result of human activity. The birds were initially widespread, occurring from the northern to the southern tip of Madagascar. One theory states that humans hunted the elephant birds to extinction in a very short time for such a large landmass (the blitzkrieg hypothesis). There is indeed evidence that they were hunted and their preferred habitats destroyed. Eggs may have been particularly vulnerable. 19th-century travelers saw eggshells used as bowls, and a recent archaeological study found remains of eggshells among the remains of human fires, suggesting that the eggs regularly provided meals for entire families.

The exact period when they died out is also uncertain; tales of these giant birds may have persisted for centuries in folk memory. There is archaeological evidence of Aepyornis from a radiocarbon-dated bone at 1880 ± 70 BP (approximately 120 CE) with signs of butchering, and on the basis of radiocarbon dating of shells, about 1000 BP (approximately AD 1000).

An alternative theory is that the extinction was a secondary effect of human impact resulting from transfer of hyperdiseases from human commensals, such as chickens and guineafowl. The bones of these domesticated fowl have been found in subfossil sites in the island (MacPhee and Marx, 1997: 188), such as Ambolisatra (Madagascar), where Mullerornis sp. and Aepyornis maximus have been reported. As also reported by these authors, ratite remains have been found in western and southwestern Madagascar, at Belo-sur-Mer (A. medius, Mullerornis rudis), Bemafandry (M. agilis) and Lamboharana (Mullerornis sp.).

Several elephant bird bones with tool marks have been dated to approximately 10,000 BC and interpreted as evidence of a long history of coexistence between elephant birds and humans; however, these conclusions conflict with more commonly accepted evidence of a much shorter history of human presence on the island and remain controversial.

In art and literature 

 The roc (rukh) is known from Sindbad the Sailor's encounter with one in One Thousand and One Nights. Some scholars think the roc is a distorted account of Aepyornis. Historical evidence for this can be found in Megiser (1623).
 H. G. Wells wrote a short story "Æpyornis Island" (1894) about the bird. It was first collected in The Stolen Bacillus and Other Incidents (1895).
 Wildlife artist Walton Ford created a painting called Madagascar about the elephant bird in 2002.

See also 

 Late Quaternary prehistoric birds
 New World Pleistocene extinctions
 Pleistocene megafauna

Notes

References

External links 
 Digimorph.org
 Fossil Aepyornithidae
 University of Sheffield excavations of elephant bird eggshells
 Vorompatra info
 Fossilised egg gives clue to fate of ancient birds The Independent
 Giant egg from extinct elephant bird up for auction

Elephant birds
Novaeratitae
Prehistoric animals of Madagascar
Pleistocene first appearances
Holocene extinctions
Taxa named by Charles Lucien Bonaparte
Roc (mythology)